Mary Bradley (born 10 May 1942) is a Social Democratic and Labour Party (SDLP) politician who was a Member of the Northern Ireland Assembly (MLA) for Foyle from 2003 to 2011.

In 1985, she was elected to Derry City Council, representing the Social Democratic and Labour Party (SDLP), and from 1991–92 she served as the Mayor of Derry. In 1996 she was an unsuccessful candidate in the Northern Ireland Forum election in Foyle. In 2003, Bradley was elected to represent Foyle in the Northern Ireland Assembly, but did not stand for election in 2011.

Bradley is a member of the Western Education Library Board and a commissioner on the Harbour Board

Born in Derry, Bradley attended the North West Institute of Further and Higher Education before working as a care assistant.  Married to Liam and has one daughter Paula along with two grandchildren named Fiona and Aaron. She has lived in the Carnhill Estate in Derry for over 30 years.

References

External links
Northern Ireland Assembly – Biography – Mary Bradley

1942 births
Living people
Northern Ireland MLAs 2003–2007
Northern Ireland MLAs 2007–2011
Female members of the Northern Ireland Assembly
Social Democratic and Labour Party MLAs
Women mayors of places in Northern Ireland
Politicians from Derry (city)
Mayors of Derry